The NHIF Civil Servants Scheme Scandal is an alleged scandal, relating to irregularities that were revealed in the Kenya Civil Servants Scheme at the National Hospital Insurance Fund, in early 2012.

The alleged irregularities included payment to ghost clinics, unprocedural selection of clinics and creation of an unapproved unit at the NHIF.

The scandal was subject to a probe by the Health Parliamentary Committee. Most of the alleged claims were found to be incorrect with time by various enquiry commissions, however investigations are still going on.

References

Politics of Kenya
2010 in Kenya
2010 in law
Law of Kenya
Corruption in Kenya